The Ozark administrative region of the Missouri Department of Conservation encompasses Carter, Dent, Douglas, Howell, Oregon, Ozark, Phelps, Pulaski, Ripley, Shannon, Texas, and Wright counties.  The regional conservation office is in West Plains.

Notes 

 Acreage and counties from MDCLand GIS file
 Names, descriptions, and locations from Conservation Atlas Online GIS file

References 

 
 

Ozark region